Daniel Archie Flynn, (February 21, 1943 – October 28, 2022) was an American businessman and rancher from Van, Texas, who was from 2003 to 2021 a Republican member of the Texas House of Representatives for District 2 (Hopkins, Hunt, and Van Zandt counties). On July 14, 2020, Flynn was defeated in his re-election attempt by Bryan Slaton by a 22-point margin in the Republican primary runoff.

Life and career
Flynn was born on February 23, 1943. He was one of House Speaker Joe Straus's loyal supporters.

In December 2008, Flynn authored a bill requiring public documents to be in English only as a means of encouraging non-English speakers to learn English.

In his 2018 primary election, Flynn defeated Bryan Slaton, an intra-party rival from Hunt County, 11,803 (51.7 percent) to 11,013 (48.3 percent). After his reelection, Flynn called once again to permit public school teachers in the state the option of displaying the Ten Commandments in their classrooms. He has been unsuccessful in previous attempts to pass such legislation. Flynn said that he did not understand why his proposal is controversial — liberals viewed it as "unconstitutional" and certain to be challenged in federal court. Flynn said the proposal merely allowed teachers "to put something in their room that is about good values."

On July 14, 2020, Flynn was defeated in his re-election attempt by Bryan Slaton by a 22-point margin in the Republican primary runoff. Slaton ran to Flynn's right. He died on October 28, 2022, at the age of 79.

Election results

2002

2004

2006

2008

2010

2012

2014

2016

2018

2020

Redistricting
Late in 2010, Representative Bryan Hughes of Mineola in Wood County, claimed that Larry Phillips, a lawmaker from Sherman, told Hughes that Dan Flynn and Erwin Cain, the newly elected conservative representative from Sulphur Springs, would be adversely redistricted for the 2012 elections because they had declined to commit to the second-term reelection of Speaker Joe Straus, a Moderate Republican from San Antonio. In a hearing before the House Ethics Committee, chaired by another East Texas representative, Chuck Hopson of Jacksonville, an ally of Speaker Straus, Phillips denied having made such a claim to Hughes. Neither Hughes nor Phillips taped the conversation. No judgment was made by the committee because of the lack of corroborating witnesses.

Flynn survived the redistricting. On March 1, 2016, Flynn narrowly won re-nomination in the Republican primary. He polled 14,917 votes (51 percent) to intraparty rival Bryan Slaton's 14,336 (49 percent).

Legislative committees
During the 86th Texas Legislature, Flynn chaired the Defense and Veterans' Affairs Committee, and also served on the House Administration Committee and the Pensions, Investments and Financial Services Committee.

References

External links
 Dan Flynn for State Representative
 State legislative page
 Dan Flynn at the Texas Tribune

1943 births
2022 deaths
Republican Party members of the Texas House of Representatives
Businesspeople from Texas
Ranchers from Texas
People from Van Zandt County, Texas
21st-century American politicians
20th-century American businesspeople
21st-century American businesspeople